Stanislav Ioudenitch (born December 5, 1971) is an Uzbekistani-born American pianist, known for winning the Nancy Lee and Perry R. Bass Gold Medal at the Eleventh Van Cliburn International Piano Competition in 2001, jointly with Olga Kern, as well as the Steven De Groote Memorial Award for Best Performance of Chamber Music. He has also won top prizes at the Busoni, Kapell, and Maria Callas Competitions, as well as at the 1998 Palm Beach Invitational and the 2000 New Orleans International. His win at the Van Cliburn Competition led to a recital debut at the Aspen Music Festival and a European tour, highlighted by appearances at summer festivals in France, Germany, Italy, and the United Kingdom.

Early life and education
Born to a family a musicians in Tashkent, Uzbekistan, Ioudenitch started playing the piano at seven. He studied at the Uspensky School of Music in Tashkent with Natalia Vasinkina, the Reina Sofía School of Music in Madrid with Dmitri Bashkirov and Galina Eguiazarova, the International Piano Foundation in Cadenabbia (present day International Piano Academy Lake Como) with Karl Ulrich Schnabel, William Grant Naboré, Murray Perahia, Leon Fleisher, Fou Ts'ong and Rosalyn Tureck, the Cleveland Institute of Music with Sergei Babayan, and the UMKC Conservatory of Music with Robert Weirich.

Personal life
With his wife, Tatiana (also a pianist), Ioudenitch has a daughter, the violinist Maria Ioudenitch.

Career
Ioudenitch has performed throughout Europe, the United States, and Asia, and collaborated with a wide range of international conductors including James Conlon, Valery Gergiev, Mikhail Pletnev, Asher Fisch, Vladimir Spivakov, Günther Herbig, Pavel Kogan, James DePreist, Michael Stern, Stefan Sanderling, Carl St. Clair and Justus Franz, and with such orchestras as the National Symphony in Washington DC, the Munich Philharmonic, Mariinsky Orchestra, the Rochester Philharmonic, the National Philharmonic of Russia, the Fort Worth Symphony and the Kansas City Symphony among others. He has also performed with the Takács, Prazák and Borromeo String Quartets and is a founding member of the Park Piano Trio at Park University in Kansas City, Missouri.

Ioudenitch is the youngest pianist ever invited to give master classes at the International Piano Academy at Lake Como, where he serves as vice president. He is currently associate professor of music/piano at Park University and associate professor at the Oberlin Conservatory of Music.

Awards
 Third Place, Busoni International Piano Competition (1991)
 Eleventh Van Cliburn International Piano Competition (2001)
 Co-winner: Nancy Lee and Perry R. Bass Gold Medal
 Steven De Groote Memorial Award for Best Performance of Chamber Music

Discography

External links
 Park University: International Center for Music faculty
 International Piano Academy Lake Como faculty: Stanislav Ioudenitch

References

Uzbekistani classical pianists
1971 births
Living people
Musicians from Tashkent
Reina Sofía School of Music alumni
Prize-winners of the Van Cliburn International Piano Competition
21st-century classical pianists
Park University faculty